Viglen Ltd provides IT products and services, including storage systems, servers, workstations and data/voice communications equipment and services.

History 
The company was formed in 1975, by Vigen Boyadjian. During the 1980s, the company specialised in direct sales through multi page advertisements in leading computer magazines, catering particularly, but not exclusively, to owners of Acorn computers.

Viglen was acquired by Alan Sugar (later Lord Sugar)'s company Amstrad in June 1994. It was listed as a public limited company in 1997, and Amstrad plc shares were split into Viglen and Betacom shares, Betacom being renamed to Amstrad PLC. Following the sale in July 2007 of Amstrad PLC to Rupert Murdoch's BSkyB, Viglen became Sugar's sole IT establishment.

Viglen used to be run by CEO Bordan Tkachuk, a longtime associate of Lord Sugar, who can be seen making special guest appearances on The Apprentice. From 1994 to 1998, the company sponsored Charlton Athletic F.C., expiring when they won promotion to the FA Premier League.

In December 2005, Viglen relocated from its London headquarters in Wembley to Colney Street near St Albans, into a building which also houses its fabrication plant. , Viglen focused particularly on the education and public sectors, selling both desktop and server systems, and also had interests in other IT markets such as managed services, high performance clusters, and network attached storage.

In July 2009, Lord Sugar resigned as the chairman of Viglen (and most of his other companies), handing over the reins of the company to longtime associate, Claude Littner. In January 2014, Sugar sold his interest in Viglen to the Westcoast Group, which merged it with another of its subsidiaries, XMA.

The Apprentice
Under its former ownership by Lord Sugar, the Viglen headquarters doubled up as one of the filming locations for the BBC programme The Apprentice, with various scenes including the infamous "job interviews" being set there. The "walk of shame" exit sequence at the end of every episode, showing the contestant leaving the building and boarding a taxi was also filmed at the Viglen Headquarters. (The boardroom scenes were actually filmed in a West London television studio.)

On 15 December 2010, CEO Bordan Tkachuk, during a mock "interview" situation on The Apprentice, told a candidate that "ISP" stood for "Internet Service Protocol" (instead of Internet Service Provider), resulting in widespread criticism:
"I know what ISP is. It's an Internet Service Protocol. And that's what you're providing. It's not a telecoms operating licence. It's a protocol that allows telecoms over bandwidths.

"I've been running Alan Sugar's companies for the last 25 years, and that's why I know a little bit about technology."

—Bordan Tkachuk

References

External links

Computer companies established in 1975
Computer companies of the United Kingdom
Companies based in the City and District of St Albans
English brands
1975 establishments in England